Nazneen Contractor (born August 26, 1982) is a Canadian actress known for her role as Layla Hourani on CBC's The Border, and as Kayla Hassan on 24 in 2010. She also guest-starred in the Letterkenny International Women’s Day special as Professor Tricia.

Early life
Contractor was born in Bombay to Parsi parents. She and her family moved to Nigeria when she was 7 and finally settled in Toronto, where she spent the majority of her childhood and young adulthood.

Personal life
After the Canadian drama series The Border finished production in 2009, she moved to Los Angeles, U.S. and married British-born actor Carlo Rota on April 1, 2010. They have a son and a daughter.

Filmography

Film

Television

Video games

References

External links
 
 
 Article about Nazneen from the University of Toronto magazine

1982 births
Canadian film actresses
Canadian television actresses
Living people
Canadian actresses of Indian descent
Parsi people from Mumbai
Canadian people of Gujarati descent
20th-century Canadian actresses
21st-century Canadian actresses
Actresses from Toronto
Canadian people of Parsi descent
Indian emigrants to Canada
Actresses from Mumbai
Canadian people of Indian descent